Moodu Mukkalaata is a 2000 Telugu-language romantic comedy film, produced by Ramoji Rao under the Ushakiran Movies banner and directed by K. Raghavendra Rao. It stars Jagapati Babu, Soundarya, Rambha, Raasi  and music composed by M. M. Srilekha.

Plot
Shanti Swaroop is a handsome college lecturer. Shravani is a librarian in the same college. Lahari and Aliveni are students studying there. These three girls fall in love with Shanti Swaroop and he loves Shravani. Shravani is staying with her married sister, in which her brother-in-law Paramahamsa has incestuous tendencies and secretly dreams of marrying Shravani by hook or by crook. Shravani's sister is paralyzed. Later, it is revealed that it is Paramahamsa who slowly poisoned his wife so that he can marry Shravani on that pretext. Lahari is a pampered sister of industrialist tycoon and millionaire Yugandhar. She misinterprets that Shanti loves her due to some incidents. When Lahari learns that he loves Shravani, she attempts suicide. Yugandhar, who learns of the incident threatens Shanti that he will kill Shanti's mother if he does not marry his sister. To avoid this, Shanti agrees to marry Lahari. Aliveni is the only daughter of Barrela Bala Raju, a famous rowdy. After coming to know that Aliveni loves Shanti, he makes her perform a drama that she got pregnant because of Shanti. To avoid the suicide of Aliveni, Shanti agrees to marry her. Shanti has agreed to marry the three damsels and Paramahamsa, Yugandhar and Bala Raju are after his life. How he manages them and how he marries Shravani forms the crux of the story.

Cast

 Jagapati Babu as Shanti Swaroop
 Soundarya as Shravani
 Rambha as Lahari
 Raasi as Aliveni
 Prakash Raj as Paramahamsa
 Nassar as Yugandhar Prasad
 Tanikella Bharani as Barrela Bala Raju
 Sudhakar as Pandu
 Brahmanandam as priest
 M. S. Narayana as Bala Raju's assistant
 A.V.S. as Gottam Govinda Raju
 Chitti Babu as priest
 L.B. Sriram as Yugandhar's assistant
 Gundu Sudharshan as Bala Raju's assistant
 Annapoorna as Shanti Swaroop's mother
 Priya as Paramahamsa's wife
 Varsha as Bhaskara Lakshmi
 Uttej
 Raja Ravindra as Nivas
 Sana as Amrita
 Delhi Rajeswari as Bala Raju's wife

Soundtrack

Music composed by M. M. Srilekha.  Music released on Mayuri Audio Company.

References

External links

2000 films
2000s Telugu-language films
2000 romantic comedy films
Indian romantic comedy films
Films directed by K. Raghavendra Rao
Films scored by M. M. Srilekha